Diego Salvatierra (born April 11, 1980 in Salta, Argentina) is an Argentine footballer currently playing for Real Potosí of the Primera División in Bolivia.

Teams
  Gimnasia y Tiro de Salta 2001-2004
  Atlético Ñuñorco 2004
  Gimnasia y Tiro de Salta 2005
  Sportivo Belgrano 2005-2006
  Bolívar 2007
  2 de Mayo 2007
  Nacional Potosí 2008
  Aurora 2009
  Real Potosí 2010–present

References
 Profile at BDFA 

1980 births
Living people
Argentine footballers
Argentine expatriate footballers
Gimnasia y Tiro footballers
Club Real Potosí players
Nacional Potosí players
Club Bolívar players
Club Aurora players
2 de Mayo footballers
Expatriate footballers in Bolivia
Expatriate footballers in Paraguay

Association footballers not categorized by position
People from Salta
Sportspeople from Salta Province